Just for Fun is an album by pianist Hank Jones with bassist Ray Brown and drummer Shelly Manne, recorded in 1977 for the Galaxy label.

Reception 

AllMusic awarded the album 4 stars, stating: "the fine interplay between the musicians and the concise and purposeful solos uplift the tunes". The Penguin Guide to Jazz wrote that the album was "consistently disappointing", with Jones's playing lacking the irony necessary for some of the material.

Track listing
 "Interlude" (J. J. Johnson)5:14
 "A Very Hip Rock & Roll Tune" (Ray Brown)4:59
 "Lullaby" (Hank Jones)5:36
 "Little Rascal on a Rock" (Thad Jones)4:02
 "Bossa Nouveau" (Pepper Adams)5:01
 "Just for Fun" (Sara Cassey)7:21
 "Kids Are Pretty People" (Thad Jones)7:30

Personnel 
Hank Jonespiano
Ray Brownbass
Shelly Mannedrums
Howard Robertsguitar (track 2, 5 & 7)

References 

1977 albums
Hank Jones albums
Galaxy Records albums